David Alwyn Bentley (born 30 May 1950) is an English former professional footballer who played in the Football League for Chesterfield, Doncaster Rovers, Mansfield Town and Rotherham United.

References

1950 births
Living people
English footballers
Association football midfielders
English Football League players
Rotherham United F.C. players
Mansfield Town F.C. players
Chesterfield F.C. players
Doncaster Rovers F.C. players